Sényő Futball Club is a professional football club based in Sényő, Szabolcs-Szatmár-Bereg County, Hungary, that competes in the Nemzeti Bajnokság III, the third tier of Hungarian football.

Name changes
 2015–present: Sényő-Carnifex FC

History
In the 2018–19 Magyar Kupa season Sényő were eliminated by 2018–19 Nemzeti Bajnokság I club Ferencváros by 4–0 at home.

Season results
As of 21 August 2018

External links
 Official website of Taksony SE
 Profile on Magyar Futball

References

Football clubs in Hungary
Association football clubs established in 1946
1946 establishments in Hungary